Crossrail 2 is a proposed hybrid commuter rail and rapid transit route in South East England, running from nine stations in Surrey to three in Hertfordshire, providing a new North–South rail link across Greater London. It is intended to alleviate severe overcrowding that would otherwise occur on commuter rail routes into Central London by the 2030s. Should permission be granted, construction is expected to start around 2023, with the new line opening from the early 2030s. The project's cost has been estimated at £31.2 billion.

The line is the fourth major rail project in the capital since 2000 (East London line extensions opened in May 2010, the Thameslink Programme opened in 2018 and Crossrail which opened in May 2022). National Rail's projections of overcrowding, including in suburbs and tourist destinations less well-served by the Underground, led it to call for more new lines and cross-London line proposals have gained more importance with Euston being named as the terminus of the planned High Speed 2 rail line.

The scheme was shelved as part of the conditions for emergency COVID-19 funding worth £1.8 billion between the government and Transport for London (TfL) announced on 1 November 2020.

The project was earlier known as the Chelsea–Hackney line (or Chelney line) in reference to a potential route. The plan for a line on this alignment has existed in various forms since 1970, initially as an Underground service and later as a standard railway.

Current plans

This route is from the 2015 public consultation.

Core section 

Operating in new tunnels at 30 trains per hour (in each direction):

Dalston (– ) Double-ended station
 
           (High Speed 1, High Speed 2, East Coast Main Line, Midland Main Line, West Coast Main Line, Thameslink)double-ended station serving Euston, King's Cross and St Pancras mainline stations and the Underground's Euston, Euston Square and King's Cross St Pancras stations
    (Crossrail Elizabeth line)
     (Brighton Main Line, Chatham Main Line)
 – the only entirely new station site
   (SWML, Brighton Main Line, Waterloo–Reading line)
  or   
     (South West Main Line, Sutton Loop Line (Thameslink)

Also in new tunnels, connected to a junction north of Dalston, at 10 and 15 trains per hour:

-   double ended station
   having surfaced, continuing to Oakleigh Road depot.

Northern Regional section 

Running at between 10 and 15 trains per hour on new rails above ground, connected to a junction north of Dalston:

Potential eastern extension
The 2015 consultation earmarks a "potential future Eastern Branch"
/   (Lea Valley lines)

South West section 

Above ground, after surfacing south of Wimbledon station, using the existing SWML slow line, and providing between 4 and 20 trains per hour, the southern section comprises:

20 trains per hour at  
8–10 trains per hour at  
10–12 trains per hour at  

Transport for London consultations

2013 consultation
In May 2013, TfL began public consultation on two potential options:
Metro route: Wimbledon – Central London – Angel – Alexandra Palace (all underground)
Regional route: Twickenham/Surbiton/Epsom – Wimbledon – Central London – Angel – Alexandra Palace (underground) plus Angel – Cheshunt.

The results of the consultation were published on 29 November 2013 by TfL and revealed broad support for the Crossrail 2 plans. 96% of respondents supported or strongly supported the plans, whilst 2% opposed or strongly opposed them. The regional route had greater support than the metro route, with 84% of respondents supporting or strongly supporting the regional route versus 73% for the metro plans.

The greatest level of opposition to the principle of Crossrail 2 came from the residents of Kensington and Chelsea, the only area with more than 5% of respondents (16%) who strongly opposed the scheme. Nearly 20% of respondents from this area either opposed or strongly opposed the scheme; the corresponding percentages in all other areas did not exceed 10%.

2014 consultation
In June 2014, a consultation began on small modifications to the 2013 proposals. The changes proposed fell broadly into three areas: extending the Alexandra Palace branch to New Southgate; relocation or removal of the Chelsea station; and moving the point at which the two northern branches diverged to beyond either Dalston Junction or Hackney Downs station, calling at only one of these two stations.

2015 consultation
A further consultation began in October 2015. In October 2015, the route proposal was changed in three ways:

 Balham was to be the preferred stop instead of the nearby alternative of Tooting Broadway. This would give a further railway interchange
 Not to serve the remainder of the Kingston Loop Line (Strawberry Hill and Twickenham).
A (pink-coloured) option bypassing Turnpike Lane and Alexandra Palace and instead going via Wood Green to support "Haringey's aspiration for the redevelopment of Wood Green High Street .. situated in the main retail area of Wood Green with access to shops, leisure and services".

In January 2015, Surrey County Council published a detailed report lobbying for TfL to consider extending branches to Dorking and Woking.

Cost and funding
The cost of the scheme has been estimated at £27–32 billion, in 2014 prices including the cost of new trains and Network Rail works. However Transport for London (TfL) argued the full cost of the project could be £45 billion in 2017. To ease the funding issues TfL recommended spreading the funding over a longer period and completing the project by the 2040s, ten years after the initial projection.

In the 2016 Budget, the Treasury gave the green light for the project, and allocated £80 million towards developing the project, with the aim of bringing forward a Hybrid Bill "this Parliament", meaning before 2020.

In the 2017 Autumn Budget, the Treasury said only that it will "continue to work with Transport for London on developing fair and affordable plans for Crossrail 2, including through an independent review of funding and financing". On 2 March 2018, the UK's Transport Secretary, who represents a seat centred on a prospective terminus of one of the branch lines (Epsom and Ewell), announced Mike Gerrard would lead the Treasury's required Independent Affordability Review, which is expected to conclude in the summer of 2018.

The Mayor of London intends to charge Mayoral Community Infrastructure Levy in the same manner as for the original Crossrail project.

The funding plan for building Crossrail 2 was postponed as part of the £1.8 billion COVID-19 pandemic financial recovery plan agreed by the government and TfL, which also required the option for driverless Crossrail 2 trains to be further investigated. Most consultancy work will be brought to an orderly end, though land for the project will be safeguarded.

History

A south-west/north-east tube line was originally planned as early as 1901 and a Bill was put before Parliament in 1904. However, political manoeuvring by rival tube magnate Charles Yerkes ended the proposal.

1970s

A south-west to north-east tube line was proposed in 1970 by the London Transport Board's London Rail Study as the next project after the completion of the Victoria line and the Fleet line (now the Jubilee line). For financial reasons the line was not built, but the idea has remained.

1980s

Following the Central London Rail Study of 1989, a route through central London was safeguarded. As the route would serve both King's Cross and King's Road it was suggested that it could be named Kings line. It was decided, however, that the Jubilee line extension should take priority and the project was postponed.

1990s

In 1995, an alternative Express Metro plan was put forward that would utilise more existing track, have fewer stations and be built to National Rail standards.

The 1991 safeguarding also included a spur south of Victoria across the river to Battersea Park, for stabling trains and to access a riverside tunnelling site.

2000s

The Express Metro option would run on the East Coast Main Line.

Crossrail was given the go-ahead in 2007 in preference to the Chelsea–Hackney line, despite some commentators favouring the latter putting implementation after Crossrail's completion date of 2018. The Chelsea–Hackney plans were taken over by Crossrail as Crossrail 2.

In 2007, the 1991 route was updated – Sloane Square was dropped and the Central line's Epping branch from Leytonstone was re-safeguarded. Due to objections from residents of Sloane Square, it was reinstated the following year. South West Trains' Wimbledon depot was safeguarded as a depot for the line. The safeguarding was enlarged from tube gauge to Network Rail loading gauge as it became clear that larger and longer trains would be needed. Of the three routes proposed for south-west London the Royal Borough of Kensington and Chelsea initially favoured one going south via Imperial Wharf to Clapham Junction, but now supports the takeover of the District line's Wimbledon branch. Under these present plans, only one entirely new station would be constructed, at Chelsea.

2010s

2008 safeguarded route
A route for the line was safeguarded (legally protected from conflicting development) in 2008. The safeguarding also includes a spur from Victoria under the Thames to Battersea Park for stabling and access to a tunnelling site. The safeguarded route was reviewed by the Department for Transport in 2013.

Northern and southern destinations
Network Rail's July 2011 route utilisation strategy (RUS) for London and the South East supports the existing safeguarded route but speculates about possible modifications in addition to re-routing via Euston. To the south, it suggests that the tunnels should go from Victoria via Clapham Junction to beyond Wimbledon, instead of surfacing near Parsons Green and taking over the District line from there to Wimbledon. To the north, it suggests that the West Anglia corridor would be a better destination than a branch of the Central line. These suggestions are driven by what the RUS sees as the need for extra capacity on the South West Main Line and the West Anglia corridor.

TfL responded by releasing its preferred options – an automatic metro and a regional scheme:

In July 2015, Surrey County Council commissioned a study to propose in detail and with cost-benefits analysed proposals, services from Surbiton as far as the main line stop of Woking (and whether or not to serve directly the four main intervening stations). Options explored were the re-routing trains so as not to terminate at Waterloo and creative timetabling plans to add capacity to the South West Main Line such as the option of moving trains onto the lighter-used New Guildford Line which runs between Surbiton and Guildford, looking at more semi-fast stopping patterns enabled as well once the Waterloo bottleneck is lifted.

Both TfL routes at both ends of the route serve Clapham Junction to a higher level than relieving the District line, and the Victoria line at its northern end, and the Central line. The regional option relieves the South West Main Line, and congested sections of the Northern line and Piccadilly line, by creating alternative routes for journeys from outside Zones 1 and 2.

In February 2013, business group London First's Crossrail taskforce, chaired by former Secretary of State for Transport Andrew Adonis published its recommendations for Crossrail 2, favouring the regional option. Later the same day, Network Rail endorsed the plans.

On 5 February 2015 Dr Michèle Dix was appointed managing director of Crossrail 2.

In March 2016, the National Infrastructure Commission said that Crossrail 2 should be taken forward "as a priority" and recommended that a bill should pass through Parliament by 2019 with the line opening by 2033.

Support and opposition

Support
Boris Johnson, Mayor of London in 2013, said at that time: "The key question now is not whether Crossrail 2 should happen, but how quickly we can get it built". Johnson, as Prime Minister, restated his backing for the project at an event to mark the opening of the Elizabeth Line in May 2022.

The current Mayor of London, Sadiq Khan, also supports the proposal, as does the former Secretary of State for Transport Chris Grayling.

Many local authorities in South-east England and London released a letter on 13 April 2017, expressing their support for Crossrail 2. ITV news reported in April 2017 that "dozens of MPs" supported Crossrail 2.

After TfL conducted a public consultation in 2017, it was reported by the Fitzrovia Partnership that 96% of respondents supported Crossrail 2 and 80% of respondents preferred the broader of the two options, the Regional option.

The London Chamber of Commerce announced it support in July 2017 with the Greater Manchester Chamber of Commerce announced support for Crossrail 2 in September 2017.

During the Elizabeth line opening ceremony in May 2022, Boris Johnson said that "the government should be 'getting on with' building Crossrail 2", however he also clarified that the business case will need to be written and put forward by Transport for London.

Opposition
In 2014, Transport for London announced that the site of the art-house Curzon cinema in Soho had been identified as an area that "may be required to enable the construction of a Crossrail 2 ticket hall" and that "plans for the above site redevelopment may include a replacement cinema". In 2015, the chairman of the "Save Soho" campaign group called the development "deeply worrying".

The plans for Wimbledon station involve the redevelopment of parts of Wimbledon town centre, including the Centre Court shopping centre. Merton Council issued a seven-page cross-party objection to the plans.

There was only a short interval between the announcements of the confirmation of continued government support for Crossrail 2 in 2017, and of the scaling back of proposed railway electrification projects which would particularly benefit Wales and Northern England. Money has been earmarked in the longer term to match London's large forecast population growth. All such forecasts rely on assumptions in terms of where people will wish to live, jobs will be created and housing targets have been set accordingly for 2015–2030, in contrast to the low growth forecast for the rest of England, all of which could be altered by government policy. Greater Manchester mayor Andy Burnham considered that the in-principle spending decision gives undue and unbalanced priority to London and South East England over other parts of the United Kingdom.

Naming
Between the 1970s and 1990s, proposals were known as the 'Chelsea-Hackney line' due to the destinations served. The proposed line gained the nickname 'Chelney', following the portmanteau example of the Bakerloo line.

In the 2000s, the project became 'Crossrail 2' in light of the east-west Crossrail project. In 2014, Mayor of London Boris Johnson called for the future line to be called the "Churchill line", after Winston Churchill.

See also 

 Crossrail
 Transport in London
 The Fifteen Billion Pound Railway - a documentary about the Elizabeth line's construction and commissioning

References

External links 

 

Proposed railway lines in London
Transport in Epping Forest District
Proposed London Underground lines
Underground commuter rail